Ujina 5-chōme is a Hiroden station (tram stop) on Hiroden Ujina Line, located in Minami-ku, Hiroshima.

Routes
From Ujina 5-chōme Station, there are three of Hiroden Streetcar routes.

 Hiroshima Station - Hiroshima Port Route
 Hiroden-nishi-hiroshima - Hiroshima Port Route
 Hiroshima Station - (via Hijiyama-shita) - Hiroshima Port Route

Connections
█ Ujina Line
  
Ujina 4-chōme — Ujina 5-chōme — Kaigan-dori

Around station
Hiroshima Municipal Ujina-higashi Elementary School
DIO Ujina

History
Opened as "4-chome" on December 27, 1935.
Closed from 1945 to November 30, 1950.
Reopened on December 1, 1950.
Renamed to "Ujina 4-chome" on March 30, 1960.
Renamed to the present name "Ujina 5-chome" on September 1, 1968.

See also
Hiroden Streetcar Lines and Routes
List of railway stations in Japan

External links

Ujina 5-chome Station
Railway stations in Japan opened in 1935